Darkness Before Dawn is a realistic young adult novel written by author Sharon M. Draper in 2001. The novel is the third and final installment in the Hazelwood High Trilogy. It depicts the story of an eighteen-year-old  African American senior Keisha Montgomery, who is attracted to the twenty-three-year-old track coach Jonathan Hathaway.

Plot summary
Eighteen-year-old Keisha Montgomery is still recovering from the suicide of her ex-boyfriend, Andy, after she broke up with him. While having the support of her friends and family, she starts to go out. She joins the track team and there meets Jonathan Hathaway, the twenty-three-year-old coach, and principal's son.  During a track meeting, a girl named Rita begins arguing with Jonathan. He denies what they were talking about and after shouting some choice curse words, she runs into the woods, never to return to school.

Over time, he begins to smooth talk her and they finally become a couple. Her parents disapprove of him being five years older and forbid her to see him. Against their wishes, she continues to see him discreetly. Her friends attempt to warn her about his true ways but she refuses to listen to them. Leon Hawkins, a friend with feelings for Keisha, also tries to warn her.

Ignoring everyone's warnings, she uses Leon to cover up her tracks when Jonathan asks her to the Valentine's dance. After the dance, Jonathan takes Keisha to his apartment and he attempts to engage in a sexual moment with her. After seeing her refusal to 'cooperate', Jonathan attempts to force her with a knife. Keisha cuts him and eventually manages to escape. She seeks the help of a homeless woman named Edna who sees her running in the snow. She takes Keisha in and gives Keisha a phone to call her parents.

Finally safe in her home, she tells her parents her experience and apologizes sincerely. She also notes her refusal to attend school, as she feels ashamed. After two weeks of absences, Rita comes back and tells her she has experienced some of the same things as Keisha but she did not escape. Mr. Hathaway resigns as the principal, and one of Jonathan's other victims presses charges, resulting in him getting a thirty-year prison sentence. Feeling relieved that Jonathan is in jail, she returns to school and Keisha graduates with the rest of her friends.

Characters

Keisha Montgomery- the main protagonist of the story, who is upset about her ex-boyfriend Andy's suicide and spends time with Jonathan Hathaway, but he attacks her later.
Jalani- a transfer student from New York and nice friend of Keisha and Rhonda. She cares a lot about Gerald
Rhonda - Keisha's best friend who is there for her throughout the story. She and Tyrone enjoy being together
Tyrone - Rhonda's boyfriend who is really close to her
B.J. Carson- Tyrone's best friend, who is short and wants to be a preacher
Gerald - another one of Keisha's friends who takes an interest to Jalani
Angel - Gerald's younger sister, who is a freshman and a dancer. She passed out during dance class because she does not eat much
Kiara Joyelle Leila Victoria Washington- Rob Washington's fourteen-year-old  sister and Angel's best friend, another freshmen. She decided to change her name from Kiara to Joyelle after Andy's funeral because she missed him and Rob so much
Monty - Andy's seven-year-old younger brother, who is also upset about his death, but still has fun with Keisha and her friends
Leon Hawkins- Keisha's classmate who is a real prankster, and has feelings for her, and considers her a close friend
Rita Bronson- a girl who was attacked by Jonathan Hathaway like Keisha. She was on the track team and disappeared after her fight with Jonathan during practice
Jonathan Hathaway- the 23 year old track coach and principal's son, who is very attractive to Keisha and attacks her with a knife in the middle of the story

Reception 
 2002 Top 10 Young Adult Library Services Association Quick Picks for Reluctant Young Adult Readers
Kirkus Reviews wrote "This series appears to be an attempt to carve out a niche of the high-school problem-novel market for African-American teens; it’s a pity this offering only complements the banality so often found in this genre."

References

2001 American novels
American young adult novels
Novels about rape
Atheneum Books books
Novels by Sharon Draper